Guam's at-large congressional district comprises the entire area of the United States territory of Guam. Guam has been represented in the United States House of Representatives by a non-voting delegate since 1972. Its first delegate, Antonio Borja Won Pat, had been serving as the Washington Representative lobbying for a delegate since 1965, elected for four-year terms in 1964 and 1968. It is currently represented by Republican James Moylan who has represented the district since 2023.

List of delegates representing the district

Recent election results

2012

2014

2016

2018

2020

2022

References 

1970 establishments in Guam
At-large United States congressional districts
At-large
Constituencies established in 1970
 
Delegates